The 15th Annual Grammy Awards were held on March 3, 1973, at the Tennessee Theatre in Nashville, Tennessee.  The event was the first Grammy ceremony not to be held in either New York City or Los Angeles (the 64th Grammys, staged in Las Vegas in 2022, would be the second).  The 15th Grammys were also the first to be broadcast live on CBS, which has carried every Grammy telecast since.

Performers

Award winners 

 Record of the Year
Joel Dorn (producer) & Roberta Flack for "The First Time Ever I Saw Your Face" performed by Roberta Flack
 Album of the Year
George Harrison (producer & artist), Phil Spector (producer), Eric Clapton, Bob Dylan, Billy Preston, Leon Russell, Ravi Shankar, Ringo Starr & Klaus Voormann for The Concert for Bangladesh
 Song of the Year
Ewan MacColl (songwriter) for "The First Time Ever I Saw Your Face" performed by Roberta Flack
 Best New Artist
America

Children's

Best Recording for Children
Christopher Cerf, Lee Chamberlin, Joe Raposo (producers), Bill Cosby & Rita Moreno for The Electric Company

Classical

Best Classical Performance - Orchestra
Georg Solti (conductor) & the Chicago Symphony Orchestra for Mahler: Symphony No. 7 in E Minor
Best Classical Vocal Soloist Performance
Dietrich Fischer-Dieskau for Brahms: Die Schöne Magelone
Best Opera Recording
Erik Smith (producer), Colin Davis (conductor) the BBC Symphony Orchestra & various artists for Berlioz: Benvenuto Cellini
Best Choral Performance, Classical (other than opera)
Georg Solti (conductor), the Vienna Boys' Choir, the Vienna Singverein Chorus, the Vienna State Opera Chorus, the Chicago Symphony Orchestra & various artists for Mahler: Symphony No. 8 in E Flat (Symphony of a Thousand)
Best Classical Performance - Instrumental Soloist or Soloists (with orchestra)
Eugene Ormandy (conductor), Arthur Rubinstein & the Philadelphia Orchestra for Brahms: Piano Concerto No. 2 in B Flat
Best Classical Performance - Instrumental Soloist or Soloists (without orchestra)
Vladimir Horowitz for Horowitz Plays Chopin
Best Chamber Music Performance
Julian Bream & John Christopher Williams for Julian and John (Works by Lawes, Carulli, Albéniz, Granados)
Best Classical Album
David Harvey (producer), Georg Solti (conductor), various artists, the Vienna Boys' Choir, the Vienna Singverein Chorus & the Chicago Symphony Orchestra for Mahler: Symphony No. 8 in E Flat (Symphony of a Thousand)

Comedy 

Best Comedy Recording
George Carlin for FM & AM

Composing and arranging

Best Instrumental Composition
Michel Legrand (composer) for "Brian's Song"
Best Original Score Written for a Motion Picture or a Television Special
Nino Rota (composer) for The Godfather
Best Instrumental Arrangement
Don Ellis (arranger) for "Theme From The French Connection" performed by the Don Ellis Big Band
Best Arrangement Accompanying Vocalist(s)
Michel Legrand (arranger) for "What Are You Doing the Rest of Your Life?" performed by Sarah Vaughan

Country

Best Country Vocal Performance, Female
Donna Fargo for "Happiest Girl in the Whole USA"
Best Country Vocal Performance, Male
Charley Pride for Charley Pride Sings Heart Songs
Best Country Vocal Performance by a Duo or Group
The Statler Brothers for "Class of '57"
Best Country Instrumental Performance
Charlie McCoy for Charlie McCoy/The Real McCoy
Best Country Song
Ben Peters (songwriter) for "Kiss an Angel Good Mornin'" performed by Charley Pride

Folk

Best Ethnic or Traditional Recording (including traditional blues)
Muddy Waters for The London Muddy Waters Sessions

Gospel

Best Gospel Performance
The Blackwood Brothers for L-O-V-E
Best Soul Gospel Performance
Aretha Franklin for Amazing Grace
Best Inspirational Performance
Elvis Presley for He Touched Me

Jazz

Best Jazz Performance by a Soloist
Gary Burton for Alone at Last
Best Best Jazz Performance by a Group
Freddie Hubbard for First Light
Best Jazz Performance by a Big Band
Duke Ellington for Togo Brava Suite

Musical show

Best Score From an Original Cast Show Album
Micki Grant (composer), Jerry Ragovoy (producer) & the original cast (Alex Bradford, Hope Clarke & Bobby Hill)  for Don't Bother Me, I Can't Cope

Packaging and notes

Best Album Cover
Acy R. Lehman (art director) & Harvey Dinnerstein (graphic artist) for The Siegel–Schwall Band performed by the Siegel–Schwall Band
Best Album Notes
Tom T. Hall for Tom T. Hall's Greatest Hits
Best Album Notes - Classical
James Lyons (notes writer) for Vaughan Williams: Symphony No. 2 (A London Symphony) conducted by André Previn

Pop

Best Pop Vocal Performance, Female
Helen Reddy for "I am Woman"
Best Pop Vocal Performance, Male
Harry Nilsson for "Without You"
Best Pop Vocal Performance by a Duo, Group or Chorus
Donny Hathaway & Roberta Flack for "Where Is the Love"
Best Pop Instrumental Performance by an Instrumental Performer
Billy Preston for "Outa-Space"
Best Pop Instrumental Performance with Vocal Coloring
Isaac Hayes for Black Moses

Production and engineering

Best Engineered Recording, Non-Classical
Armin Steiner (engineer) for Moods performed by Neil Diamond
Best Engineered Recording, Classical
Gordon Parry, Kenneth Wilkinson (engineers) Georg Solti (conductor) & the Chicago Symphony Orchestra for Mahler: Symphony No. 8 (Symphony of a Thousand)

R&B

Best R&B Vocal Performance, Female
Aretha Franklin for Young, Gifted and Black
Best R&B Vocal Performance, Male
Billy Paul for "Me and Mrs. Jones"
Best R&B Vocal Performance by a Duo, Group or Chorus
The Temptations for "Papa Was a Rollin' Stone"
Best R&B Instrumental Performance
Paul Riser & Norman Whitfield (The Temptations) for "Papa Was a Rollin' Stone (Instrumental)"
Best R&B Song
Barrett Strong & Norman Whitfield (songwriters) for "Papa Was a Rollin' Stone" performed by The Temptations

Spoken

Best Spoken Word Recording
Bruce Botnick (producer) for Lenny performed by the original cast

References

External links
15th Grammy Awards, at the Internet Movie Database

 015
1973 in Tennessee
1973 music awards
20th century in Nashville, Tennessee
1973 in American music
March 1973 events in the United States